Lady Sour (literally 'Vinegar Wife') is a 2014 Hong Kong costume drama, comedy, romance produced and developed by Hong Kong's Television Broadcasts Limited, starring Myolie Wu, Ron Ng, Him Law, Eliza Sam, and Jade Leung as the main cast. Filming took place from November 2013 to January 2014. The drama was broadcast on Hong Kong's TVB Jade and HD Jade channels between December 1 and December 28, 2014 every Monday through Friday during its 8:30-9:30 pm time slot with a total of 20 episodes.

Plot
Cho Tsing and her mother Cho Cho Bi Yue are itinerant beauticians wandering the country in search of Cho Tsing's missing father. In the course of their wanderings, Cho Tsing falls in love with Tsin Tung and the two become husband and wife.

San Cha has been Tsin Tung's personal maid since childhood, and the two have an understanding that ignites Cho Tsing's jealousy. Cho Tsing's attempts get rid of San Cha by marrying her off backfire when Tsin Tung realises he loves her and takes her as a concubine. Cho Tsing resents having to share a husband with another woman and, when Tsin Tung divorces her, she seeks solace with another man, her former enemy Kai Chun.

Cast
The following names uses Cantonese romanisations

Tsin Family

Cho family

Other cast

Development
Lady Sour was originally intended to be the third installment of "Wars of In-laws", but due to Myolie Wu and Bosco Wong's real-life split in 2012 plans to reunite the two main leads were scrapped. Also Liza Wang had to turn down the drama due to schedule conflicts. 
The drama's plot was revealed at TVB's "2014 Sales Presentation". Additional cast was also revealed.
Him Law was confirmed as the male lead of the drama in July 2013. Lady Sour is Law's first ancient costume drama.
During the costume fitting ceremony Ron Ng was confirmed as the actual male lead of the drama. Him Law was pushed back as the second male lead. 
The costume fitting ceremony was held on November 11, 2013 at 12:30 pm Tseung Kwan O TVB City Studio One Common Room.
Filming took place from November 2013 till January 2014.
Lady Sour is also co-star Eliza Sam's first ancient costume drama. Sam who was born and raised in Vancouver Canada had difficulty pronouncing her lines and understanding the script due to the text written in ancient Chinese grammar.

Complaints
Ron Ng received numerous audience complaints regarding his over exaggerated acting.

International Broadcast
  - 8TV (Malaysia)

Viewership Ratings

References

External links
TVB Official Website (Chinese)

TVB dramas
Hong Kong television series
2014 Hong Kong television series debuts
2014 Hong Kong television series endings
2010s Hong Kong television series